The 2017–18 Iowa State Cyclones men's basketball team represented Iowa State University during the 2017–18 NCAA Division I men's basketball season. The Cyclones were coached by Steve Prohm, who was in his third season at Iowa State. They played their home games at Hilton Coliseum in Ames, Iowa as members of the Big 12 Conference. They finished the season 13–18, 4–14 in Big 12 play to finish in last place. They lost in the first round of the Big 12 tournament to Texas.

Previous season
The Cyclones finished the 2016–17 season 24–11, 12–6 in Big 12 play to finish in a three-way tie for second place.  They defeated Oklahoma State, TCU, and West Virginia to win the Big 12 Conference tournament. As a  result, they earned the conference's automatic bid to the NCAA tournament as a No. 5 seed. They defeated Nevada in the First Round of the NCAA Tournament before losing in the Second Round to Purdue.

Offseason

Departures

2017 recruiting class

Incoming transfers

Future recruits

2018–19 team recruits

Roster

Schedule and results

|-
!colspan=12 style=| Exhibition

|-
!colspan=12 style=| Regular Season

|-
!colspan=12 style=| Big 12 Tournament

Awards and honors

 Big 12 Player of the Week

Nick Weiler-Babb (November 20)

 Big 12 Newcomer of the Week

Lindell Wigginton (December 11)
Lindell Wigginton (January 15)
Cameron Lard (January 22)

See also
 2017–18 Iowa State Cyclones women's basketball team

References

Iowa State Cyclones men's basketball seasons
Iowa State
Iowa State Cyc
Iowa State Cyc